Maizières-lès-Metz (literally Maizières near Metz; Lorrain: Mach'ire) is a commune in the Moselle department in Grand Est in north-eastern France.

Anciently part of the Duchy of Lorraine,  Maizières was within the Holy Roman Empire until 1766, when Lorraine was annexed by France. From 1871 to 1918, as part of Alsace-Lorraine, Maizières belonged to the German Empire as Maizières-bei-Metz. Between 1915 and 1918 the town's name was briefly Germanized to Macheren. During the German occupation from 1940 to 1944 it was known as Machern-bei-Metz.

The amusement park Walygator is located in Maizières-les-Metz.

The town gives its name to the now German Maizière family which, being Huguenots, had to emigrate from the Duchy of Lorraine to Prussia in the 17th century. Preserving the name of their town up to the present, prominent members of the family include Lothar de Maizière, last Prime Minister of the German Democratic Republic, the politician Thomas de Maizière and the general Ulrich de Maizière.

Population

International relations

Maizières-lès-Metz is twinned with Bukowsko, Poland and Montastruc-la-Conseillère, France.

See also
 Communes of the Moselle department

References

External links
 

Maiziereslesmetz